The 2015 Oceania Athletics Championships were held at Barlow Park in Cairns, Australia, between May 8–10, 2015.  The event was held jointly with the 2015 Oceania Youth Athletics Championships and the 2015 Oceania Combined Events Championships.  Moreover, there were also exhibition events for masters and athletes with a disability (parasports), as well as school events for age groups 5 to 15 years.  Detailed reports on a day by day basis were given.

Initially, a total of 48 events were scheduled.  However, results for women's pole vault could not be retrieved.  The event was most probably cancelled resulting in a total of 47 contested events, 24 by men, 22 by women, and 1 mixed.

Medal summary
Complete results can be found on the Oceania Athletics Association webpage.

Men

1.) In the 1500m event, George Yamak, finished 3rd in 4:11.07 competing as a guest.
2.) The pole vault event was won by Peter Hollenbeck, Athletics North Queensland, in 4.50m competing as a guest.

Women

Mixed

Masters (exhibition)

Medal table (unofficial)

Participation (unofficial)
According to an unofficial count, 215 athletes (+ 2 guests) from 20 countries and territories participated.  There were two additional teams: one athlete represented Australian Masters Athletics (dubbed "AMA" in the result lists).  As in the years before, there was also a "Regional Australia Team" Northern Australia (dubbed "RAT" in the results list) comprising Australian athletes who "either have their normal place of residence (defined as being a place where an athlete is resident and/or educated) in an "athletically remote area" of Australia (defined as a being a place more than 300 km from any centre at which track and field competition is held on a regular basis i.e. basically weekly or fortnightly during the track season) or "Northern Australia" (defined as comprising the Northern Territory and any parts of Western Australia and North Queensland, north of 26th parallel south latitude)".

References

Oceania Athletics Championships
International athletics competitions hosted by Australia
Oceania Athletics Championships
Oceania Athletics Championships
May 2015 sports events in Australia